Here Come the Newlyweds is a reality television series that first premiered on ABC on March 2, 2008. The series' first season ran through April 6, 2008. A second season premiered on May 25, 2009 and aired through July 13, 2009. The show is hosted by Pat Bullard. The title of the program came from the announcer's introduction of the contestants on an earlier, more famous ABC game show, The Newlywed Game, which began with: "From the Chuck Barris stages in Hollywood, California, here come the newlyweds!"

On July 24, 2007, ABC has ordered the show to series. It was renewed for a second season on September 27, 2008 with an expanded episode order of 8 episodes.

Season one

Contestants

Eliminations

 IN The couple was safe for that episode.
 WINNER The couple won the competition.
 OUT The couple was voted off.
 RUNNER-UP The couple finished the competition in second place.
 IM The couple won immunity.
 IM/OUT The couple won immunity and was voted off.

News and Notes
Week 1: After winning immunity, the Jacobis were offered $10,000 to give up their immunity. They chose the $10,000, and were subsequently voted off.
Week 2: After winning immunity, the Moutras were offered $15,000 to give up their immunity. They rejected the money, and the Bajwas were voted off.
Week 3: After winning immunity, the Holmeses were offered $20,000 to give up their immunity. They rejected the money, and the Woodwards were voted off.
Week 4: After winning immunity, the Freises were offered $30,000 to give up their immunity. Cody took the money and Dawn was unhappy that they would possibly be voted off. They spent the remainder of the episode scheming and promising both the Holmeses and the Moutras (separately) that they would not vote them off next week in return, if that couple chose to take the immunity challenge money. The Krashins were ultimately voted off, but it is unknown by what margin.
Week 5: After winning immunity, the Holmeses were offered nothing to give up their immunity. In fact, they were told that they would be choosing who accompanied them to the final two. The Moutras and the Freises both pleaded their cases separately, but within earshot of each other. At vote-off time, the Holmeses asked to be allowed to inform the couples of their decision themselves. They voted off the Freises.

The Winning Couple
Crystal and Johnnie Moutra were declared the winners of the grand prize, $465,000, on the April 6, 2008 show.

Season two

Contestants

Eliminations

 IN The couple was safe for that episode.
 WINNER The couple won the competition.
 RUNNER-UP The couple finished the competition in second place.
 OUT The couple was voted off.
 RISK The couple was at risk of elimination.
 IM The couple won immunity.
 IM/OUT The couple won immunity, took the money, and was voted out.

News and Notes
Week 1: After winning immunity, the Smiths were offered $10,000 to give up their immunity. They chose the $10,000, and were subsequently voted off.
Week 2: After winning immunity, the Hinkinses were offered $15,000 to give up their immunity. They rejected the money, and the Oskowskis were voted off.
Week 3: After winning immunity, the Huffmans were offered $20,000 to give up their immunity. They rejected the money, and the Coxes were voted off.
Week 4: After winning immunity, the Hinkinses were offered $25,000 to give up their immunity. They rejected the money, and the Huffmans were voted off.
Week 5: After winning immunity, the Newberys were offered $30,000 to give up their immunity. They rejected the money, and the Iengs were voted off.
Week 6: After winning immunity, the Newberys were offered $40,000 to give up their immunity. They rejected the money, and the Hinkinses were voted off. After the elimination, the McMorrises admitted to lying and voting for the Hinkinses after having promised the Hinkinses that they would vote the other couple off.
Week 7: After winning immunity, the McMorrisses were offered $50,000 to give up their immunity. They rejected the money and chose who would accompany them to the final two. The McMorrises chose the Corlisses and the Newberys were voted off.

The Winning Couple
Mark and Marlo Corliss were declared the winners of the grand prize, $480,000, on the July 13, 2009 show.

After the Show
 Bridget and Brendan Huffman have two children, a girl and a boy.
 Katie and Nick Oskowski have three children.
 The Corlisses are divorced.
 Sonarak and Michele Ieng have a baby girl. 
 Kenny and MaKayla McMorris have two children.
 Jed and Sarin Hinkins have three girls.
 Matt and Andrea Smith have two children,  a girl and boy.
 Rich and Audra Newberry have twin boys.

References

External links

2000s American reality television series
2008 American television series debuts
2009 American television series endings
American Broadcasting Company original programming
Television series by Warner Horizon Television